Daniel Boyarin (born 1946) is a Religion historian, Born in New Jersey, he holds dual United States and Israeli citizenship. He is the Hermann P. and Sophia Taubman Professor of Talmudic Culture in the Departments of Near Eastern Studies and Rhetoric at the University of California, Berkeley. He is married to Chava Boyarin, a lecturer in Hebrew at UC Berkeley. They have two sons. His brother, Jonathan Boyarin, is also a scholar, and the two have written together.

Career 
Raised in Asbury Park, New Jersey, Boyarin attended Freehold High School. A graduate of the class of 1964, Boyarin was inducted into the school's hall of fame in 2009.

Boyarin was educated at Goddard College, the Jewish Theological Seminary, and Columbia University before earning his doctoral degree at the Jewish Theological Seminary of America. He has taught at Ben Gurion University of the Negev, the Hebrew University of Jerusalem, Bar-Ilan University, Yale, Harvard, Yeshiva University, and the University of California at Berkeley. He is a member of the Enoch seminar, and of the Advisory Board of the journal Henoch. In 2005, he was elected fellow of the American Academy of Arts and Sciences.

A number of Boyarin's students, including Christine Hayes, Charlotte Fonrobert, and Azzan Yadin, occupy Rabbinics posts at various American universities. A discussion of the merits of Boyarin's scholarship is featured in the opening scene of Joseph Cedar's Oscar-nominated film Footnote.

Views and writings
His first book, Sephardic Speculation (written in Hebrew), examines the Talmudic methodology of Isaac Canpanton (1360-1463, Spain). Boyarin's first English book, Intertextuality and the Reading of Midrash (1990), is often credited with introducing Literary Theory into the field of Rabbinics. . Carnal Israel: Reading Sex in Talmudic Culture (1993) applies the methods of New Historicism to the subject of Rabbinic attitudes toward sexuality. A Radical Jew: Paul and the Politics of Identity (1994) argues that misreadings of Paul the Apostle's universalist philosophy eventually led to violent coercion.

In Unheroic Conduct (1997), Boyarin's interests mesh with those of others, such as Sander Gilman and Jay Geller, who have begun to explore the relationship between psychoanalysis and Judaism. For Boyarin, the Oedipus complex both incarnates and disavows a fear Sigmund Freud had of being classified as feminine in the context of the times in which he lived, times that were antisemitic and that ultimately culminated in the Holocaust. Boyarin holds that passivity is an essential feature of Judaism, and that because this is a quality that is held in common with homosexuality, it has the power to inspire panic among Jews who fear the censorious gaze of authority. Consequently, he claims, Freud conceived of the Oedipus complex as a way of deferring the charge of Jewish femininity by offering proof that Jews, no less than Gentiles, had within them the desire to kill.

Boyarin supports his argument that passivity is essential to Judaism with the observation that Judaism worships a powerful male authority figure who demands obeisance, and with documentary evidence such as Haggadot, prayer guides for the Jewish Passover ritual of the Seder, that show the wise son as the retiring scholar, and the wicked son as the man of war. This leads Boyarin to oppose Zionism, as he feels that the necessary element of activity and war entailed in ruling over a land is at odds with what he identifies as the authentic and persistent current of scholarship that defines the tradition. Martha Nussbaum credits him with the insight that Jewish sensibilities "reshaped Roman norms of manliness, making the astonishing claim that the true man sits still all day with a book, and has the bodily shape of someone who does just that".

Border Lines (2004) examines the early stages of the partition of Judaism and Christianity into two separate and distinct religions. Socrates and the Fat Rabbis (2009) explores the dialogic structure in Plato and the Babylonian Talmud. The Jewish Gospels: The Story of the Jewish Christ (2012) carries on the line of exploration begun in Border Lines, developing the argument that "New Testament" ideas can be found in long-standing Jewish traditions. Professor Boyarin also written extensively on Talmudic and Midrashic studies. His work focused on Cultural studies in Rabbinic Judaism, and also includes the issue about gender and sexuality, and research as well on the Jews as Colonized People.His current research interests center primarily around questions of the relationship of Judaism and Christianity in late antiquity and the genealogy of the concept of “religion.”

Historic Jesus scholarship

Historic Paul Scholarship

Views on Israel
Boyarin has complex views on Zionism and a critical view of the Israeli government. In the preface to one of his books, where he discusses the many versions of Judaism in late antiquity and the binary model that gatekeeps definitions of Judaism, he writes in passing: "On the stairs of my synagogue, in Berkeley, on Rosh Hashanah this year, I was told that I should be praying in a mosque, and versions of this, less crude perhaps, are being hurled at Jews daily by other Jews. [...] More piercing to me is the pain of watching a tradition, my Judaism, to which I have dedicated my life, disintegrating before my eyes. It has been said by many Christians that Christianity died at Auschwitz, Treblinka, and Sobibor. I fear, God forbid, that my Judaism may be dying at Nablus, Deheishe, Betein (Bethel), and El-Khalil (Hebron). [...] If we are not for ourselves, other Jews say to me, who will be for us? And I answer, but if we are for ourselves alone, what are we?" In a highly publicised essay, Alvin H. Rosenfeld, Director of the Institute for the Study of Contemporary Anti-Semitism, criticised Boyarin for these words - and in particular for the parallel to the Holocaust, which, according to Rosenfeld, is 'a sure sign that lucid thinking has been replaced by bias' - and concludes that through these remarks, 'Jewish identity is affirmed in opposition to the Jewish state'. Rosenfeld's 'controversial report' and, especially, his use of quotations, have been criticised for taking things out of context.

Bibliography 
 A Critical Edition of the Babylonian Talmud, Tractate Nazir. (Doctoral dissertation, 1975).
 Sephardic Speculation: A Study in Methods of Talmudic Interpretation, (Hebrew), (Jerusalem: Hebrew University, 1989).
 Intertextuality and the Reading of Midrash, (Bloomington: Indiana University Press, 1990).
 Carnal Israel: Reading Sex in Talmudic Culture, (Berkeley: University of California Press, 1993).
 A Radical Jew: Paul and the Politics of Identity, (Berkeley: University of California Press, 1994).
 Unheroic Conduct: The Rise of Heterosexuality and the Invention of the Jewish Man, (University of California Press, 1997)
 Dying for God: Martyrdom and the Making of Christianity and Judaism, (Stanford University Press, 1999)
 Queer Theory and the Jewish Question, (Columbia University Press, 2003)
 Border Lines: The Partition of Judaeo-Christianity, (University of Pennsylvania Press, 2004)
 Socrates and the Fat Rabbis, (University of Chicago Press, 2009)
 The Jewish Gospels: The Story of the Jewish Christ, (The New Press, 2012)
 A Traveling Homeland: The Babylonian Talmud as Diaspora, (University of Pennsylvania Press, 2015)
 Imagine No Religion: How Modern Abstractions Hide Ancient Realities, with Carlin A. Barton (Fordham University Press, 2016)
 Judaism: The Genealogy of a Modern Notion, (Rutgers University Press, 2019)

See also
 Géza Vermes
 Paula Fredriksen

References

External links 
 Professor Daniel Boyarin Home page at University of California, Berkeley
 A Radical Jew: Paul and the Politics of Identity E-text at California Digital Library
 Enoch Seminar website
 Journal Henoch website

1946 births
21st-century American historians
21st-century American male writers
American Orthodox Jews
Goddard College alumni
Columbia University alumni
Freehold High School alumni
Harvard University faculty
Academic staff of the Hebrew University of Jerusalem
Jewish anti-Zionism in the United States
Jewish feminists
Jewish American historians
American male non-fiction writers
Jewish Theological Seminary of America alumni
Living people
Male feminists
People from Asbury Park, New Jersey
University of California, Berkeley College of Letters and Science faculty
Yeshiva University faculty
Historians of Jews and Judaism
Historians from California
Historians from New Jersey
21st-century American Jews